The Livonian Rhymed Chronicle is a chronicle written in Middle High German by an anonymous author. It covers the period 1180 – 1343 and contains a wealth of detail about Livonia — modern South Estonia and Latvia.

The old Chronicle 
The Rhymed Chronicle was composed to be read to the crusading knights of the Livonian Order during their meals. Its primary function was to inspire the knights and legitimise the northern Crusades. As such, it is infused with elements of romance and exaggerated for the purpose of drama. However, this is debated by A. Murray. He suggests that during mealtimes the knights were read sections of the Bible or the word of God, so that they could 'receive spiritual as well as corporal nourishment'. There was little of this in the Chronicle. There is also the fact that the Chronicle is written in high German, and the majority of the knights who were in Livonia at that time would have spoken low German. This would mean that they would have struggled to have understood what was being read to them anyway. Murray argues that due to its imagery used to describe the battles and its focus on military expeditions it is more likely to have served a purpose to appeal to the mentality of those who may have volunteered for service with the Livonian Brothers of the Sword and Teutonic Order to encourage them to join the orders.

The Younger Chronicle 
A second rhyme chronicle, known as the Younger Livonian Rhymed Chronicle, was written in Low German by Bartholomäus Hoeneke, chaplain of the Master of the Livonian Order, around the end of the 1340s. It is this chronicle that narrates how Estonians slaughtered their own nobility and called the Livonian Order to Estonia, which, in turn, butchered them, on 1343. The original is lost but prose paraphrases survive.

Editions 
 Fragment einer Urkunde der ältesten livländischen Geschichte in Versen. Ed. Lib. Bergmann. Riga 1817
 Livländische Reimchronik. Ed. Franz Pfeiffer. Stuttgart 1844 (Reprint: Amsterdam 1969)
 Livländische Reimchronik. Mit Anmerkungen, Namenverzeichnis und Glossar. Ed. Leo Meyer. Paderborn 1876 (Reprint: Hildesheim 1963)
 Atskaņu hronika. Transl. Valdis Bisenieks, ed. Ēvalds Mugurēvičs. Riga 1998
 Liivimaa vanem riimkroonika. Transl. Urmas Eelmäe. Tallinn 2003
 Cronaca Rimata della Livonia (Livländische Reimchronik). Original parallel Text. Transl. Piero Bugiani, Viterbo 2016.

See also
Livonian Chronicle of Henry

References

Further reading 
 Hartmut Kugler: "Über die "Livländische Reimchronik": Text, Gedächtnis und Topographie". In: Brüder-Grimm-Gesellschaft: Jahrbuch der Brüder-Grimm-Gesellschaft, vol. 2 (1992), pp. 85–104.
 "Ditleb von Alnpeke", in: Allgemeines Schriftsteller- und Gelehrten-Lexikon der Provinzen Livland, Estland und Lettland, ed. J. F. v. Recke and C. E. Napiersky. Vol. I: A-F, Mitau 1827, online.
 Alan V. Murray: "The structure, genre and intended audience of the Livonian Rhymed Chronicle". In: Crusade and conversion on the Baltic frontier, 1150-1500. ed. Alan V. Murray, Aldershot 2001, pp. 235–251.

13th-century history books
14th-century history books
German chronicles
Livonian Order